C18 may refer to:

Science and technology
 Caldwell 18 (NGC 185), a dwarf spheroidal galaxy of the Local Group in the constellation Cassiopeia
 Carbon-18 (C-18 or 18C), an isotope of carbon
 , the molecular formula of cyclo(18)carbon
 C18, an octadecyl-type hydrocarbon with 18 carbon atoms, such as
 Fatty acids such as
 Stearic acid, C18H36O2
 Oleic acid C18H34O2
 C18 bonded silica stationary phase column, a type of reversed-phase chromatography column
 IEC 60320 C18, a power connector
 Colorectal cancer (ICD-10 code)
 ISO/IEC 9899:2018 standard for the programming language C, informally named C18

Transportation and military
 HMS C18, a submarine
 Sauber C18, a Formula One racing car
 Chrysler Royal C18, a 1938 car
 The C-18, a military cargo version of the Boeing C-137 Stratoliner

Other uses
 French Defence (Encyclopaedia of Chess Openings code)
 Combat 18, a British neo-Nazi organization
 18th century (1701–1800 AD)
 Android 18, character from Dragon Ball Franchise